Interactive Picture Systems, or IPS, was a software developer located in Philadelphia from 1982 to 1985. The company was run by partners Guy Nouri of NYC and Eric Podietz of Philadelphia. Staff included Jimmy Snyder, Mark Scott, Ken Appleman, Bob Svihovec, and Chip Kaye. IPS developed educational and creativity software initially for the Atari 8-bit family, then for the Apple II and Commodore 64.

Products

Creativity software
PAINT! (1982, Atari 8-bit, Reston)
MovieMaker (1984, Atari 8-bit, Reston) also published by Electronic Arts in 1985

Educational software
Trains (1983, Atari 8-bit, Spinnaker)
Aerobics (1984, Atari 8-bit, Spinnaker)
Grandma's House (1984, Atari 8-bit, Spinnaker)
Operation Frog (1984, Apple II / Commodore 64, Scholastic) virtual-dissection software; introduced at the 1984 Summer CES

References 

Software companies established in 1982
Companies disestablished in 1985
1982 establishments in Pennsylvania
Atari 8-bit family
Defunct software companies of the United States